Kalateh-ye Nuri (also Romanized as Kalāteh-ye Nūrī and Kalāteh-i-Nuri; also known as Kalāt-e Mānī, Kalāteh ‘Īsá, and Nūrī) is a village in Arabkhaneh Rural District, Shusef District, Nehbandan County, South Khorasan Province, Iran. At the 2006 census, its population was 43, in 13 families.

References 

Populated places in Nehbandan County